Huddersfield Rugby Union Football Club is an English rugby union team based in Huddersfield, West Yorkshire, England. The club plays in the domestic National League 2 North having won promotion from National League 3 North as champions at the end of the 2016–17 season. The club also competes in the Yorkshire Cup competition and play its home matches at Lockwood Park, which has a capacity of 1,500 with seating for 500. HRUFC also has an academy squad, feeding the senior team with new players.

History
Rugby football was first played in Huddersfield in 1869 and the club established in 1870. Matches were initially played at the Rifle Field in Trinity Street and then, with the amalgamation of the St John's Cricket Club, at Fartown from 1879.

Huddersfield was playing in the top ranks of English clubs when, in August 1895, the town hosted a meeting at the George Hotel and was one of the 20 clubs that resigned from the Rugby Union to set up The Northern Rugby Football Union, which allowed players to be compensated for 'Broken Time.'  This meant they could claim for wages lost by playing on Saturdays. They were not allowed to make a living from the game – they were not 'professional.'  A new club was re-formed and named Huddersfield Old Boys in 1909. 

The club's first ground was at the United Cricket Club in Luck Lane with changing facilities at the Croppers Arms.

World War I blew the whistle on the sport and games were not restarted until 1919 on a ground at Salendine Nook initially before the club took a lease on land at Waterloo. It was here that the club established their current colours of white, claret and gold. A stand was built and changing rooms completed for exclusive rugby use a luxury in those days. But the ground was plagued with drainage problems and another move was contemplated. In the event it was decided to buy the ground outright for £700 and invest in drainage. In 1935 £370 was invested in a new pavilion and bar and ladies were welcomed to a hitherto male bastion and they themselves began the tradition of post-match tea making. By 1964 the original pavilion was falling to bits and a new one, costing £11,000, was officially opened by Huddersfield's then MP J P W Mallalieu, himself a former Oxford Blue.

In 1946 the club changed their name to Huddersfield Rugby Union Football Club. The club sold part of its Waterloo property for £1.4 million to W Morrison's to help fund the purchase of the  former brewery estate at Lockwood Park from Bass in 1996 to create a major sports complex backed by a £1.84 million Sport Council lottery grant.

The club won the Yorkshire Cup in 2011 for the first time in its history, beating Hull RUFC 25–18 at York RUFC.  The Huddersfield team which won the cup in 1890 was the direct antecedent of the Huddersfield Giants and is unconnected to the current Huddersfield RUFC.

Honours

 North 2 (east v west) promotion play-off winner (2): 2001–02, 2004–05
 North 1 v Midlands 1 promotion play-off winner: 2007–08
 Yorkshire Cup winners: 2011
 National League 3 North champions (2): 2013–14, 2016–17

Notable players
The following players have appeared in a Yorkshire Cup (T'owd Tin Pot) final, or are county, or international representatives before/during/after their time at Huddersfield RUFC
Luther Burrell
Chris Johnson circa-2011
Kearnan Myall
Lee Paxman circa-2011
Frank Sykes
James Wood circa-2011

Associated clubs
As well as being a rugby club Huddersfield RUFC also has clubs based at Lockwood Park catering for hockey, squash, road running, astronomy and a bowling club that boasts arguably the finest green in Yorkshire. Tucked away within the huge clubhouse is the Borough Club for the town's serious snooker players.

Lockwood Park
Lockwood Park is the home of Huddersfield RUFC and is a multi-sports complex with a capacity of 1,500 (with seating for 500). It is also the home of Huddersfield Dragons Hockey Club, Huddersfield Road Runners AC, Huddersfield Astronomical Society, HRUFC Bowling Club, Malcolm Pickup Academy Squash and the Borough Club which offers snooker facilities.

It was also the home ground of the Huddersfield Giants Rugby League Academy and Scholarship teams, who enjoyed relative success whilst at Lockwood Park.

Current standings

References

External links
 Official website
 Kirklees website
 Wikmapia

English rugby union teams
Rugby clubs established in 1909
Sports clubs in Huddersfield
Rugby union in Yorkshire
Sports venues in Huddersfield